Eugenie Bouchard and Sofia Kenin were the defending champions, but chose not to participate this year.

Asia Muhammad and Taylor Townsend won the title, defeating Serena Williams and Caroline Wozniacki in the final, 6–4, 6–4.

Seeds

Draw

Draw

References

External links
 Main draw

ASB Classic - Doubles
WTA Auckland Open